Bebington was a local government district on the Wirral Peninsula, in Cheshire, England.

It was the local authority for the towns of Bebington and Bromborough. New Ferry and Port Sunlight were also within its boundaries. The district also included the civil parishes of Brimstage, Eastham, Poulton cum Spital, Raby, Storeton and Thornton Hough.

Created in 1922 as an urban district, it absorbed Bromborough Urban District, Higher Bebington Urban District and Lower Bebington Urban District. The new jurisdiction was known as Bebington and Bromborough Urban District. Its name was changed to Bebington Urban District in 1933, shortly before being incorporated as a municipal borough in 1937. 

The coat of arms of Bebington were granted on 3 January 1934. The shield featured two wheatsheaves, an emblem of the county of Cheshire and a ship to represents the borough's proximity to the River Mersey and the Manchester Ship Canal. The saltire of St. Andrew in the upper-centre, depicts to whom Bebington parish church is dedicated. Bromborough Cross is featured at the top of the crest.

On 1 April 1974, under the Local Government Act 1972, the municipal borough was abolished and its area absorbed into the Metropolitan Borough of Wirral, in the metropolitan county of Merseyside.

References

History of Cheshire
History of Merseyside
Local government in the Metropolitan Borough of Wirral
Bebington
Bebington